The Museum of Natural History at Wrocław University is a large natural history museum at the University of Wrocław, in Wrocław, Poland.

The museums insect collections include: 
Friedrich Wilhelm Niepelt's collection of exotic butterflies (South America, Sunda Archipelago and tropical Africa)
Johann Ludwig Christian Gravenhorst, Ichneumonidae  
Rudolph Dittrich, Hymenoptera
Max Wiskott, Palaearctic Lepidoptera
Jan Noskiewicz, Hymenoptera
Hermann Julius Kolbe, Coleoptera
Jadwiga Zlotorzycka, Mallophaga
August Assmann, Hemiptera, Palaearctic Lepidoptera.

External links
Official Site

University of Wrocław
Natural history museums in Poland
University museums
Natural History